St. Joseph is a city in and the county seat of Buchanan County, Missouri, United States. Small parts of St. Joseph extend into Andrew County. Located on the Missouri River, it is the principal city of the St. Joseph Metropolitan Statistical Area, which includes Buchanan, Andrew, and DeKalb counties in Missouri and Doniphan County, Kansas. As of the 2020 census, St. Joseph had a total population of 72,473, making it the eighth largest city in the state, and the third largest in Northwest Missouri. St. Joseph is located roughly thirty miles north of the Kansas City, Missouri city limits and approximately 125 miles (201 km) south of Omaha, Nebraska.

The city was named after the town's founder Joseph Robidoux and the biblical Saint Joseph. St. Joseph is home to Missouri Western State University. It is the birthplace of rapper and songwriter Eminem, who grew up in and has made his career in Detroit, Michigan. In the nineteenth century, it was the death place of American outlaw Jesse James. It was also the starting point of the Pony Express serving the West.

History

St. Joseph was founded on the Missouri River by Joseph Robidoux, a local fur trader of French Canadian descent. It was officially incorporated in 1843. In its early days, it was a bustling outpost and rough frontier town, serving as a last supply point and jumping-off point for travelers on the Missouri River toward the "Wild West". It was the westernmost point in the United States accessible by rail until after the American Civil War.

The main east–west downtown streets were named for Robidoux's eight children: Faraon, Jules, Francois (Francis), Felix, Edmond, Charles, Sylvanie, and Messanie. The street between Sylvanie and Messanie was named for his second wife, Angelique.

St. Joseph, or "St. Joe", as it was called by many, was a "Jumping-Off Point" for those migrants headed to the Oregon Territory in the mid-1800s. Such cities, including Independence, and St. Joseph, were where pioneers would stay and purchase supplies before they headed out in wagon trains across the Great Plains. The town was a very lively place.

Between April 3, 1860, and late October 1861, St. Joseph was one of the two endpoints of the Pony Express, which operated for a short period over the land then inaccessible by rail, to provide fast mail service. Along with the mail, the riders carried a small personal Bible. Today the Pony Express Museum hosts visitors in the former stables of the company. St. Joseph is identified by the slogan, "Where the Pony Express started and Jesse James ended."

The town's main hotel was Patee House. In the post-Civil War years, when the economy was down, the hotel was used for a time by the Patee Female College. It was occupied by the St. Joseph Female College up to 1880.

Outlaw Jesse James lived here under the alias "Mr. Howard". The song, "Jesse James", includes the lines, "...that dirty little coward that shot Mr. Howard has laid poor Jesse in his grave." On April 3, 1882, James was killed at his home, originally located at 1318 Lafayette. It has been relocated next to the Patee House and still has the visible bullet hole from the fatal shot. It is now operated as the Jesse James Home Museum.

The Heaton-Bowman-Smith Funeral Home maintains a small museum about Jesse James. Their predecessors conducted his funeral.

St. Joseph was the second city in the US to install electric streetcars; regular service was initiated on July 4, 1888.
Among properties listed on the National Register of Historic Places are Robidoux Row, buildings owned by the founder and used for his family trading and mercantile business; the Patee House, now serving as a museum of transportation, and the Missouri Theatre, an ornate movie palace. The Walnut Park Farm Historic District near St. Joseph was listed on the National Register of Historic Places in 1999.

St. Joseph's population peaked in 1900, with a census population of 102,979. This population figure is questionable, as civic leaders were known to have tried to raise the numbers for that census. At the time, Saint Joseph was home to one of the largest wholesale companies in the Midwest, the Nave & McCord Mercantile Company, as well as the Hannibal and St. Joseph Railroad, and the C.D. Smith & Company.  C.D. Smith later became C.D. Smith Healthcare.

Prior to 1954 and desegregation, Batlett High School served St. Joseph's African American students. It became Horace Mann Elementary with desegregation. St. Joseph's African American community leaders and Nathaniel C. Bruce were involved in and supported the establishment of Bartlett Agricultural and Industrial School in Dalton, Missouri. It was modeled after Tuskegee Institute and Hampton Institute.

Geography and climate

Saint Joseph is located at  (39.757944, -94.836541), on the Missouri/Kansas border in northwestern Missouri, also close to Nebraska; Iowa is another 70 miles farther north.

Under the Köppen climate classification, St. Joseph has a humid subtropical climate (Cfa) bordering on a humid continental climate (Dfa), although under United States isotherms of  the station is firmly continental. The monthly weather averages listed below are taken from National Weather Service 1981-2010 Normals recorded at Rosecrans Airport. Because of the Airport's location near the Missouri River and at a low elevation, official overnight lows during wintertime especially are often several degrees colder than at other places within the city.  Snowfall is not recorded at the St Joseph weather station although surrounding reporting stations typically receive 12-20 inches of snowfall annually.

Demographics

2010 census
As of the census of 2010, there were 76,780 people, 29,727 households, and 18,492 families residing in the city. The racial makeup of the city was 87.8% White, 6.0% Black, 0.5% Native American, 0.9% Asian, 0.2% Pacific Islander, 2.0% from other races, and 2.7% from two or more races. Hispanic or Latino of any race were 5.7% of the population.

There were 29,727 households, of which 32.0% had children under the age of 18 living with them, 42.0% were married couples living together, 14.5% had a female householder with no husband present, 5.7% had a male householder with no wife present, and 37.8% were non-families. 30.7% of all households were made up of individuals, and 12.2% had someone living alone who was 65 years of age or older. The average household size was 2.43 and the average family size was 3.01.

In the city, the population was spread out, with 23.6% under the age of 18; 11.7% between the ages of 18 and 24; 26.1% from 25 to 44; 24.9% from 45 to 64; and 13.8% who were 65 years of age or older. The median age in the city was 35.6 years. The gender makeup of the city was 49.8% male and 50.2% female.

2000 census
As of the census of 2000, there were 73,990 people, 29,026 households, and 18,460 families residing in the city. The population density was 1,687.7 people per square mile (651.6/km). There were 31,752 housing units at an average density of 724.2 per square mile (279.6/km). The racial makeup of the city was 91.9% White, 5.0% Black, 0.5% Native American, 0.5% Asian, <0.1% Pacific Islander, 0.7% from other races, and 1.4% from two or more races. Hispanic or Latino of any race were 2.6% of the population.

There were 29,026 households, out of which 30.1% had children under the age of 18 living with them, 46.7% were married couples living together, 12.8% had a female householder with no husband present, and 36.4% were single-family households. 30.4% of all households were made up of individuals, and 13.2% had someone living alone who was 65 years of age or older. The average household size was 2.39 and the average family size was 2.98.

In the city, the population was spread out, with 24.1% under the age of 18, 11.6% from 18 to 24, 28.6% from 25 to 44, 20.3% from 45 to 64, and 15.4% who were 65 years of age or older. The median age was 36 years. For every 100 females, there were 95.6 males. For every 100 females age 18 and over, there were 92.7 males.

The median income for a household in the city was $32,663, and the median income for a family was $40,995. Males had a median income of $31,300 versus $21,592 for females. The per capita income for the city was $17,445. About 9.1% of families and 13.0% of the population were below the poverty line, including 15.5% of those under age 18 and 9.8% of those age 65 or over.

1900 census
During the 1900 census, efforts by local officials, business leaders, and other city boosters to show rapid growth led to double-counting.  The actual population in 1900 is believed to be closer to 75,000-80,000.

Business
Saint Joseph has a vibrant and diversified local economy. The local area supports a large food processing industry. Bio-fuels, meat and grains processing, candies, and various other products well known throughout North America are made in Saint Joseph. With this specific industry come other associated packaging and food processing equipment suppliers that employ many more persons.

Saint Joseph is at the center of the Kansas City Animal Health Triangle, which extends from Manhattan, KS to Columbia, MO. With this advantageous location, Saint Joseph is home to several Animal Health Pharmaceutical, Animal Nutrition, and associated research facilities. Other agricultural products including herbicides for crop production are produced in St. Joseph.

Transit America Services, a subsidiary of Herzog, provides conductors and other railway technical positions for transit rail systems nationwide. Herzog Contracting, parent company to Transit America, is based in the city and provides construction services, rail equipment, rail testing, and signaling services to freight and transit systems throughout North America and the Caribbean. Attached is a list of the largest employers in St. Joseph, MO. Other privately held manufacturing companies are also top employers but they do not publicly disclose employment numbers. Saint Joseph has the 3rd largest manufacturing economy in Missouri, after Saint Louis and Kansas City. In June 2019, total employment in the St. Joseph Metropolitan Area was 65,099 persons.

Retail
St. Joseph is home to several retail areas, many of which are grouped along Belt Highway on the city's east side. East Hills Mall is located at North Belt Highway and Frederick Boulevard. The mall opened in 1965, was expanded in 1988, and was renovated in 2001 with a far more extensive renovation in 2008 and 2009. Developed in 2005, the Shoppes at North Village is concentrated along North Belt Highway between approximately Cook and County Line roads. This serves as a regional shopping destination. Other shopping districts include Belt Center, Hy-Vee Shopping Center, Hillcrest Plaza, East Ridge Village, and Woodlawn Shopping Center. Saint Joseph's trade area encompasses parts of NE Kansas, NW Missouri, SE Nebraska, and SW Iowa.

Education

Public schools
The St. Joseph School District operates three public high schools, four public middle schools and 16 public elementary schools in St. Joseph. There are three private grade schools, a private high school and a private K-12 Christian school. Two new elementary schools (Oak Grove and Carden Park) have been constructed, and both opened by the 2014–15 academic year. In addition, there is an active home education community that serves the city and surrounding areas. In higher education, St. Joseph is the home of a regional public university as well as a public university outreach center, a public technical school and a private technical school.

Public elementary schools
Carden Park Elementary School — (K-06)
Coleman Elementary School — (K-06)
Edison Elementary School — (PK-06)
Ellison Elementary School — (K-06)
Eugene Field Elementary School — (K-06)
Hosea Elementary School — (PK-06)
Hyde Elementary School — (K-06)
Lindbergh Elementary School — (PK-05)
Mark Twain Elementary School — (PK-06)
Oak Grove Elementary School — (K-06)
Parkway Elementary School — (PK-06)
Pershing Elementary School — (K-06)
Pickett Elementary School — (PK-06)
Skaith Elementary School — (PK-06)

Public middle schools
Bode Middle School — (07-08)
Robidoux Middle School — (06-08)
Spring Garden Middle School — (06-08)
Truman Middle School — (07-08)

Public high schools
Central High School — (09-12)
Benton High School — (09-12)
Lafayette High School — (09-12)

Private schools
Bishop LeBlond High School (9-12)
Cathedral Grade School
St. Francis Xavier Grade School (K-9)
St. James Grade School
St. Joseph Christian School
St. Paul Lutheran School (K-9)
Prescott Seventh-Day Adventist School

Colleges and universities
Missouri Western State University

Special focus institutions
American College of Technology
Hillyard Technical Center
Webster Learning Center

Library
St. Joseph has a four-branch public library system. The system is overseen by the Library Board which consists of nine members appointed by the mayor, with city council approval, for three-year terms. The Downtown Library, located in downtown St. Joseph, houses the administrative offices for the library system. Carnegie Library and Washington Park Library are neighborhood branches that serve communities in the North and South ends of the city. East Hills Library is the largest branch, located off Interstate 29, which serves the greater St. Joseph area. Downtown Library and Carnegie Library were listed on the National Register of Historic Places in 1982 and 1990 respectively.

Transportation

The St. Joseph Transit is publicly owned and provides bus service. Rosecrans Memorial Airport is a joint municipal/military owned airport for general aviation. It is the home of the 139th Airlift Wing of the Missouri Air National Guard, and does not have commercial service. The nearest commercial airport is Kansas City International Airport, which is approximately 35 miles (56 km) to the south.

The city is served by two Interstate highways, one proposed interstate, and four U.S. Routes:
, which runs south to Kansas City and north to Council Bluffs, Iowa
, a western bypass of St. Joseph.
, might come to St. Joseph in the future.
, the Pony Express Highway, running east to Cameron and west to Hiawatha, Kansas
, which runs south to Atchison, Kansas, and north into western Iowa
, which runs south concurrent with I-29 to Kansas City, and north to Maryville
, which runs south to Kansas City, and north to Winterset, Iowa

In addition, four state routes serve the city:

Cityscape
Numerous parks, golf courses, sports complexes, skate parks, a water park, a riverwalk along the Missouri River, and a small conservation area can be found throughout St. Joseph proper. The city is also nationally known for its  parkway system, which is accompanied by an urban trail system. Two of the city's largest parks are Krug Park and Hyde Park; these respectively anchor the parkway and urban trail on the north and south. A dog park has been added to the parkway system near Corby Pond.

Media
St. Joseph currently ranks 201st largest designated market area out of 210 media markets in the United States (as ranked by Nielsen Media Research); the market covers six counties in northwestern Missouri (Holt, Worth, Nodaway, Andrew, DeKalb and Buchanan) and Doniphan County in northeastern Kansas. The St. Joseph area has three low-power and two full-power television stations, and ten radio stations. News-Press & Gazette, a media corporation, is headquartered in Saint Joseph. They have interests in numerous television, radio, and newspaper markets throughout the Midwestern and Western United States.

Television
Due to its proximity to Kansas City, stations from that market serve as default affiliate of MyNetworkTV (KSMO-TV/Kansas City) and default member station of PBS (KCPT/Kansas City) due to the lack of stations of either network licensed to the market. ABC affiliate KQTV had long been the only major commercial station in St. Joseph, but in June 2012, the locally based News-Press & Gazette Company signed-on KNPN-LD as a Fox affiliate, KBJO-LD as a CW+ affiliate, and KNPG-LD as a Telemundo affiliate. This in turn was followed by the conversions of KBJO-LD to NBC affiliate KNPG-LD in November 2016 (retaining the CW+ as a LD2 subchannel), and the original KNPG-LD (which assumed the KBJO-LD call letters) to CBS affiliate KCJO-LD in June 2017, ending out-of-market reliance for major network programming.

Local broadcast stations

Local independent cable channels
 News-Press 3 NOW, Suddenlink channel 3/KNPN-LD virtual channel 26.3 (Local news)

Radio

Newspapers
 St. Joseph News-Press
 The Saint Joseph Telegraph
 The Regular Joe

Notable people

References

External links
 
 
 City of St. Joseph
 Downtown Different | Saint Joseph, MO
 Historic maps of St. Joseph in the Sanborn Maps of Missouri Collection  at the University of Missouri

 
Cities in Buchanan County, Missouri
County seats in Missouri
Cities in Missouri
St. Joseph, Missouri metropolitan area
Populated places established in 1843
Missouri populated places on the Missouri River
1843 establishments in Missouri